Alexandra Anderson (born 25 March 1994) is an Australian rules footballer playing for the Brisbane Lions in the AFL Women's (AFLW). Anderson was part of the Brisbane team that won the AFL Women's premiership in 2021 and won the AFL Women's season seven best and fairest award. She is also a dual Brisbane best and fairest winner and was named in the 2019 AFL Women's All-Australian team. Anderson is the AFL Women's equal games record holder and Brisbane equal games record holder with 66 games.

Early life
Anderson was born in 1994 in Brisbane, Queensland raised by Leigh and Reggie (a paramedic and Aboriginal Gangulu Redcliffe Dolphins rugby league player) from Theodore, Queensland inland from Rockhampton. She was educated at Kedron State High School where she was introduced to Australian Rules by her sister Mikayla and encouraged by her school teacher who was from Melbourne to pursue a career in the sport. She played club football for the Zillmere from junior to senior level and represented Queensland at Under 18 level in 2013.

AFL Women's career

She made her debut in the Lions' inaugural game against  at Casey Fields on 5 February 2017. Brisbane signed Anderson for the 2018 season during the trade period in May 2017.

Brisbane signed Anderson for the 2019 season during the trade and signing period in May 2018.

Anderson had a career-best season in 2019, capped off by winning the Brisbane best and fairest award and being selected in the 2019 AFL Women's All-Australian team.

Leading into the 2020 season, womens.afl journalist Sarah Black named Anderson at no. 26 on her list of the top 30 players in the AFLW. She was also selected in the AFL Players Association's 2017–2019 retrospective AFL Women's 22under22 team. Anderson finished the season as one of fourteen players to have played the most AFL Women's matches to that point with 30.

Anderson was named at no. 21 in Sarah Black's 2022 list of the top 30 players in the AFLW.

Statistics
Updated to the end of S7 (2022).

|-
| 2017 ||  || 18
| 8 || 0 || 1 || 29 || 29 || 58 || 6 || 26 || 0.0 || 0.1 || 3.6 || 3.6 || 7.3 || 0.8 || 3.3 || 0
|-
| 2018 ||  || 18
| 8 || 1 || 0 || 90 || 53 || 143 || 22 || 40 || 0.1 || 0.0 || 11.3 || 6.6 || 17.9 || 2.8 || 5.0 || 1
|-
| 2019 ||  || 18
| 7 || 1 || 0 || 91 || 56 || 147 || 27 || 35 || 0.1 || 0.0 || 13.0 || 8.0 || 21.0 || 3.9 || 5.0 || 3
|-
| 2020 ||  || 18
| 7 || 0 || 2 || 73 || 55 || 128 || 30 || 17 || 0.0 || 0.3 || 10.4 || 7.9 || 18.3 || 4.3 || 2.4 || 2
|-
| bgcolor=F0E68C | 2021# ||  || 18
| 11 || 2 || 1 || 121 || 83 || 204 || 32 || 39 || 0.2 || 0.1 || 11.0 || 7.5 || 18.5 || 2.9 || 3.5 || 9
|-
| 2022 ||  || 18
| 12 || 2 || 4 || 132 || 68 || 200 || 26 || 50 || 0.2 || 0.3 || 11.0 || 5.7 || 16.7 || 2.2 || 4.2 || 2
|-
| S7 (2022) ||  || 18
| 13 || 2 || 4 || 178 || 100 || 278 || 42 || 69 || 0.2 || 0.3 || 13.7 || 7.7 || 21.4 || 3.2 || 5.3 || bgcolor=98FB98 | 21±
|- class=sortbottom
! colspan=3 | Career
! 66 !! 8 !! 12 !! 714 !! 444 !! 1158 !! 185 !! 276 !! 0.1 !! 0.2 !! 10.8 !! 6.7 !! 17.5 !! 2.8 !! 4.2 !! 38
|}

Honours and achievements
Team
 AFL Women's premiership player: 2021
 2× AFL Women's minor premiership: 2017, S7

Individual
 AFL Women's best and fairest: S7
 AFL Women's equal games record holder
 Brisbane equal games record holder
 AFL Women's All-Australian team: 2019
 2× Brisbane best and fairest: 2019, 2021
 AFL Women's 2017–2019 22under22 team

References

External links
 
 
 

1994 births
Living people
Sportspeople from Brisbane
Sportswomen from Queensland
Australian rules footballers from Queensland
Brisbane Lions (AFLW) players
Indigenous Australian players of Australian rules football